Dauman Music is an American entertainment company and record label headquartered in Los Angeles.  The company was founded in 2007 by Jason Dauman who was originally a song placer and music publisher.

In 2019, Dauman Music was the No. 5 Dance Label Imprint and the No. 8 Dance Club Label according to Billboard Magazine's year end charts.

Dauman Music has had 3 No. 1 songs on the Billboard Dance Club Chart: "Euphoria" by The Perry Twins featuring Harper Starling (2018), "Back to Life" by Hilary Roberts (2019), and "Self Control" by Kendra Erika (2019).

The company has represented songs released by notable artists such as Dionne Warwick, Debbie Gibson, Marc Stout, Jessica Sutta of the Pussycat Dolls, Tyga, Melissa Manchester, Al Jarreau, Snoop Dogg, Sean Kingston, Fat Joe, Frankie J, Jeff Timmons, Tiffany, and Clint Holmes.

Jason Dauman 
Jason Dauman was born in Manhattan and is a cousin to former Viacom CEO Phillipe Dauman.  His father Sidney founded Dauman Displays, one of the world's leading point of purchase display companies, whose clients included Revlon, Gillette, Elizabeth Arden, Anheuser-Busch among many others.

Jason's career has spanned three decades and has included work as a record executive, song placer, music supervisor, music publisher, marketing and promoting expert, and founder and CEO of pop/dance label Dauman Music.

Dauman states,

As a song placer and music publisher, Dauman worked independently and later joined Universal Music Group.  Dauman has represented, at one point or another, U2, Bruce Springsteen, Burt Bacharach, Carole Bayer Sager, Billy Steinberg, Garth Brooks, Glen Ballard, Tom Kelly, Rick Nowels, John Wesley Harding, Makeba Riddick, The Jackie Boyz, Damon Elliott, Maria McKee, Allan Rich, and Frank Wildhorn.

Early in his career, Dauman introduced his client Albert Hammond to Diane Warren resulting in a collaboration that lead to several hit singles including "Nothing's Gonna Stop Us Now" by Starship and "Don't Turn Around" by Ace of Base along with other singles for Elton John, Aretha Franklin, Neil Diamond, Chicago, Joe Cocker, and Tina Turner among others. He later went on to place the Billboard No. 1 hit "I Don't Have the Heart" with James Ingram, and "I'll Stand by You" with The Pretenders.  Others who have recorded the song I'll Stand By You include Carrie Underwood, Rod Stewart, Girls Aloud, Patti LaBelle, and Shirley Bassey. Dauman's placement of "Falling into You" by Billy Steinberg for Celine Dion became the titular track on her Grammy Award-winning album.

Dauman Music 
Dauman music was founded in 2007.  It has had over 75 charting singles and has been a particularly strong force in the Dance Club Songs chart of Billboard.  In 2019, Billboard Magazine named Dauman Music the No. 5 Dance Imprint Label of the Year, and the No. 8 Dance Record Label of the Year thanks in part to Billboard Dance Club Songs No. 1 hits by Kendra Erika ("Self Control"), and Hilary Roberts ("Back to Life").

Other popular songs associated with the label include "Girls Night Out" by Debbie Gibson, "You Really Started Something" by Dionne Warwick, "Just Another Day" by Tiffany, "Lithium" by Athena, "Forever" by Ralphi Rosario featuring Frankie, "Oasis" by Kendra Erika, and "Let it Rain" by Amy Weber and Sean Kingston, as well as hits by Snoop Dogg, Tiffany, Taylor Dayne, Joanna Krupa, Jeff Timmons, Frankie J, Klymaxx feat. Bernadette Cooper, and Laura Bryna.

Some of the remixers associated with Dauman Music are Dave Audé, Klaas, Tracy Young, Ralphie Rosario, The Wideboys, Moto Blanco, Sick Individuals, Liquid Todd, DJ Kue, Stonebridge, and Narada Michael Walden.

The company is also involved with jazz and pop music. In 2017, the label partnered with L&L Music to lead the promotional campaign for jazz singer Clint Holmes's album "Rendezvous" produced by Gregg Field. The album featured prominent jazz artists such as Jane Monheit, Ledisi, Dave Koz, Dee Dee Bridgewater, and The Count Basie Orchestra. The album was nominated for a Grammy Award in 2017.

Jason Dauman is heavily active in the company and enjoys being involved with all aspects of its operation including working with producers and remixers, video production, promotion, public relations and social media, and product placement and licensing.

Complete List of Billboard Dance Club Songs Charting Singles

See also 

 List of record labels

References

External links 

 
American record labels
Record label distributors
IFPI members
Multi-channel networks
Companies based in Los Angeles
American companies established in 2005
Entertainment companies established in 2005
Mass media companies established in 2005
Record labels established in 2005